Jarmot Kalan is a town, Union council and administrative subdivision of  Gujar Khan Tehsil in the Punjab Province of Pakistan.

References

Populated places in Gujar Khan Tehsil
Union councils of Gujar Khan Tehsil
Towns in Gujar Khan Tehsil